David Graham Light (born 2 March 1944) is a former English cricketer.  Light was a right-handed batsman.  He was born at Luton, Bedfordshire.

Light made his debut for Bedfordshire against Hertfordshire in the 1968 Minor Counties Championship.  He played minor counties cricket for Bedfordshire from 1968 to 1976, making a total of 32 appearances, the last of which came against Cambridgeshire.  In 1974, he made a single List A appearance for Minor Counties South against Glamorgan at Shardeloes, Amersham, in the Benson & Hedges Cup.  Glamorgan batted first, making 123 all out from 53.2 overs.  Chasing that total, Minor Counties South were dismissed for 89, with Light being dismissed for 6 runs by Malcolm Nash.

References

External links
David Light at ESPNcricinfo
David Light at CricketArchive

1944 births
Living people
Bedfordshire cricketers
Cricketers from Luton
English cricketers
Minor Counties cricketers